André "Gigueto" Soares is a Brazilian jiu-jitsu and mixed martial arts fighter. He competes in the flyweight division, and is also an instructor.

History 
Shares started training in martial arts at 9 years old practicing Judo. At the age of 15 he fell in love with Brazilian jiu-jitsu. When he was a purple belt he was invited to try out for the Carlson Gracie Competition Team. To make the team there was a tournament style training session in the middle of Carlson Gracie's gym. He won the tournament and became a Team A competitor. His skills grew quickly and he won the Brazilian Nationals in 1998. He trained with Carlson Gracie for five years until Carlson moved to the US and the team split up. Soares followed his teammates over to BTT (Brazilian Top Team) where he competed and received his black belt in 2001.  He came in second in the 2002 World Championships.

In 2004, he moved to Florida to reunite with ATT (American Top Team) founder Ricardo Liborio and his master Marcus Aurelio. Soares competed in MMA and jiu-jitsu in America.  He won Hawaii Shooto 2005, and took first in the Arnold Schwarzenegger/Gracie World Submission championships.

Mixed martial arts record

|-
|Loss
|align=center|5-2
|Zach Makovsky
|Decision (unanimous)
|EliteXC: Primetime
|
|align=center|3
|
|New Jersey, United States
|
|-
|Win
|align=center|5-1
|Josh Spearman
|Submission (guillotine choke)
|BCX 4 - Battle Cage Xtreme 4
|
|align=center|1
|align=center|0:19
|New Jersey, United States
|
|-
|Win
|align=center|4-1
|Matt McCabe
|Submission (armbar)
|CITC 3 - Marked Territory
|
|align=center|1
|align=center|1:09
|Collins Arena, Brookdale College, Lincroft, NJ.
|
|-
|Win
|align=center|3-1
| Ryan Lee
|Submission (triangle choke)
|Shooto Hawaii - Unleashed
|
|align=center|1
|align=center|2:38
|Hawaii, United States
|
|-
|Win
|align=center|2-1
| Jim Bruketta
|Submission (armbar)
|FCC 18 - Freestyle Combat Challenge 18
|
|align=center|1
|
|Wisconsin, United States
|
|-
|Loss
|align=center|1-1
| Tom Niinimaki
|Decision
|CWFC 9 - Xtreme Xmas
|
|align=center|3
|align=center|5:00
|England
|
|-
|Win
|align=center|1-0
| Ulises Rocha
|Decision (unanimous)
|IC 8 - Ethereal
|
|align=center|2
|align=center|5:00
|Indiana, United States
|
|-

References

External links

Brazilian male mixed martial artists
Featherweight mixed martial artists
Mixed martial artists utilizing Brazilian jiu-jitsu
Brazilian practitioners of Brazilian jiu-jitsu
People awarded a black belt in Brazilian jiu-jitsu
Living people
Year of birth missing (living people)